Hilongos (IPA: [hɪ'lɔŋos]), officially the Municipality of Hilongos, is a 2nd class municipality in the province of Leyte, Philippines. According to the 2020 census, it has a population of 64,514 people.

Hilongos is the biggest municipality in terms of income, population and land area in the southwestern part of Leyte. A string of five equidistant municipalities, namely Inopacan, Hindang, Hilongos, Bato and Matalom comprises the southwestern part of Leyte and Hilongos being at the geographic center is also the center for government, religion, shipping, rice production, commerce, banking, financial institutions, telecommunications, health facilities, education, sports and socio-cultural activities.

The Port of Hilongos is one of the biggest and busiest in Eastern Visayas (Region 8) and is well known for its good passenger and cargo services to Cebu City and vice versa. Due to its strategic location and close proximity to the city of Cebu, Hilongos Port caters quite a number of day and night trips to and from the city and is the primary choice for travelers from the southern part of Leyte. Also, Hilongos has an airport, the Hilongos Airport in particular, which can be more helpful and useful if improved further (for many years, travelers from the southern part of Leyte need to go as far as Tacloban or Cebu just to avail the services of commercial airlines).
Hilongos has two (2) public markets and two (2) transport terminals. The municipality is composed of fifty-one (51) barangays with vast coastal plains used mainly in the production of rice.

History

Lore has it that in the 12th century, Amahawin, an Ilonggo from Iloilo, conquered neighboring barangays on Leyte's western shore and extended his territory to the present limits of Inopacan, Hindang, Bato, and Matalom. He formed a settlement and named it Hilongos, because its inhabitants were Ilonggos.

In 1710, the Jesuits created a residence there. However,  claims that Hilongos became a parish only in 1737. This date corresponded to the establishment of the town.

1754 was the date of the oldest parish books (deaths) as of 1884.

In 1768, the Jesuits ceded Hilongos to the Augustinians.  In 1774–79, the Augustinians established schools in Hilongos. In 1784, Palompon, a Hilongos visita, became an independent parish.

In 1862, Manicar led a revolt at Barrio Santa Margarita.

In 1873, Leovio Magia led a revolt. Unlike the towns of eastern Leyte, which were ceded to the Franciscans in 1843, the towns along Leyte's western coast fell one by one under the seculars.

In late 1992, an unrecognized municipal government ran by the New People's Army from within Barangay San Antonio, Hilongos collapsed upon being taken over by the Philippine National Police (PNP).

On December 28, 2016, two explosions rocked the small town during the town fiesta. The explosion occurred in Barangay Central Poblacion were a boxing match was being held. At least 34 people residents were injured and brought to the Hilongos District Hospital and other nearby hospitals. Officials said an IED was used in the attack.  No suspects were identified.

Geography
Hilongos shares borders with the municipalities of Hindang to the north, Mahaplag to the northeast, Sogod (Southern Leyte) and Bontoc (Southern Leyte) to the east, Bato to the south and to the west lies the Camotes Sea.

Barangays
Hilongos has 51 barangays, namely:

Climate

Economy

Demographics

Culture

Heritage sites

Church complex—The present church's bell tower is attributed by Redondo to a secular Don Leonardo Celis-Díaz, a native of Cebu. The building of the church fabric itself is disputed.

The church complex underwent major renovations over the centuries. The original church, now incorporated as a transept, was a single-nave structure whose main door was also the gate to a bastioned fortification.  Some bastions and walls of that fortification still remain. The main nave of the church is a modern construction, and the bell tower build by Fr. Celis-Diaz is an independent multi story structure, now plastered over with Portland cement.

The church interior is completely new in contrast to the convento which may have been completed in the 19th century. The convento guards many of the church's antiques including silver vessels from the 18th century.

Transportation

Shipping

 Roble Shipping Inc.: Ro-Ro/Passenger/Cargo service, day & night trips to Cebu City and vice versa
 Gabisan Shipping Lines Inc.: Ro-Ro/Passenger/Cargo service, day & night trips to Cebu City and vice versa
 Peñafrancia/Santa Clara Shipping Corporation: Ro-Ro/Passenger/Cargo service, daily trips to Ubay, Bohol and vice versa
Seacat (Grand Ferries): Fastcraft, trips to Cebu City and vice versa
 Leopards Motorboat Service: daily trips to Ubay, Bohol and vice versa
 Also, a number of cargo vessels are making call at the port of Hilongos mostly for cement and copra

Land
Main Type of Transportation: Bus/Mini-Bus/Van/Jeep/Multicab
Route: Hilongos-Tacloban (vice versa), Hilongos-Ormoc/Baybay (vice versa), Hilongos-Maasin (vice versa)
Other Types of Land Transport Facilities: Electronic Tricycles (RACAL), Sidecars (Tricycles), Trisikad or locally called as "Pot-pot" and also "Habal-habal" a motorcycle that is used as the mode of transport for the mountainous parts of Interior Hilongos.

Air

Education

Tertiary

 MLG College of Learning (MLGCL)
 Virginia Institute of Technology (VIT)

Secondary

 Hilongos National Vocational School (HNVS)
 Saint Teresa School of Hilongos (STSH)
 Grelina Osmeña Christian College (GOCC)
 MLG College of Learning (MLGCL)
 Naval National High School
 Bung-aw National High School
 Santa Margarita National High School
 Concepcion National High School
 Hitudpan National High School 
 Talisay National High School
 Hampangan National High School

Elementary

 Hilongos South Central School (Hilongos South District)
 Lamak Central School (Hilongos North District)
Concepcion Central School (Hilongos East District)
 Saint Teresa School of Hilongos (STSH)
 Grelina Osmeña Christian College (GOCC)
 MLG College of Learning (MLGCL)
 Other Elementary and Primary Schools of Hilongos North, Hilongos South and Hilongos East Districts and other private institutions

See also
2016 Hilongos explosion

References

External links

 [ Philippine Standard Geographic Code]
Local Governance Performance Management System
All about Hilongos

Municipalities of Leyte (province)